Zion is a census-designated place (CDP) in Adair County, Oklahoma, United States. The population was 41 at the 2010 census.

Geography
Zion is located at  (35.796881, -94.633765).

Demographics

As of the 2010 United States Census, there were 41 people residing in Zion.  The population density was 28 people per square mile (11/km2).  There were 15 housing units at an average density of 10/sq mi (4/km2).  The racial makeup of the CDP was 20.83% White, 56.25% Native American, and 22.92% from two or more races.

There were 16 households, out of which 37.5% had children under the age of 18 living with them, 56.3% were married couples living together, 12.5% had a female householder with no husband present, and 25.0% were non-families. 25.0% of all households were made up of individuals, and 18.8% had someone living alone who was 65 years of age or older. The average household size was 3.00 and the average family size was 3.58.

In the CDP, the population was spread out, with 27.1% under the age of 18, 10.4% from 18 to 24, 22.9% from 25 to 44, 25.0% from 45 to 64, and 14.6% who were 65 years of age or older. The median age was 36 years. For every 100 females, there were 140.0 males. For every 100 females age 18 and over, there were 169.2 males.

The median income for a household in the CDP was $28,250, and the median income for a family was $28,250. Males had a median income of $28,750 versus $13,750 for females. The per capita income for the CDP was $6,920. There were 18.2% of families and 15.7% of the population living below the poverty line, including 17.2% of those under 18 and 16.7% of those over 64.

References

Census-designated places in Adair County, Oklahoma
Census-designated places in Oklahoma